Damascus Township may refer to the following townships in the United States:

 Damascus Township, Henry County, Ohio
 Damascus Township, Wayne County, Pennsylvania